Three ships named HMS Brunswick have served the British Royal Navy:

  was launched at Oswego and served on the Great Lakes until she was condemned in 1786.
  was a 74-gun third-rate ship of the line launched at Deptford; she was broken up in 1826.
  was an 80-gun screw third rate launched at Pembroke Dockyard; she was sold in 1867.

References
 

Royal Navy ship names